There are parts of Nigeria closer to the water and provide for areas that have Islands. Places like Lagos, Rivers and other lower ends of the Niger-Delta with close access to rivers and oceans, allow for the natural or artificial formation of Islands.  Some of the islands in Nigeria are included below:

 Abagbo Island
 Andoni Island 
 Banana Island
 Bonny Island
 Brass Island
 Ebute-Oko Island
 Eko Atlantic
 Gberefu Island
 Ikoyi
 Nsutana
 Parrot Island
 Lagos Island
 Ogogoro island
 Snake Island
 Takwa bay island
 Tincan Island
 Victoria Island

Abagbo Island
Abagbo Island is the last island on the outskirt of Lagos. The island has been perturbed by its riverine area, which has caused less than stellar improvements in terms of modernisation and seemingly slow pace of development. The ex-governor of Lagos State, Bola Tinubu, took up a project to develop and modernize riverine areas like Abagbo.

Notes

Nigeria
Islands